The 2009 S.League (officially known as the Great-Eastern-Yeo's S.League for sponsorship reasons) was the 14th season since the establishment of the S.League. Singapore Armed Forces FC won their eighth S.League title.

Changes to the league include:
Monthly claim of S$2,000 for the local clubs from the FAS if they sign a foreign player who is a newcomer to the S-League.
 DPMM FC have replaced Dalian Shide Siwu in 2009 season.

Teams

Foreign players
Each club is allowed to have up to a maximum of 4 foreign players.

 Albirex Niigata (S) and Super Reds are not allowed to hire any foreigners.

League table

Results
Fixtures and Results of the S. League 2009 season.

Note: The results are broken down into weeks rather than rounds, as some teams may play 2 or more games a week due to the nature of the league system (games are played every day). Hence, sometimes, teams may not play in the league some weeks due to other competition commitments or re-arranged games.

Week 1
The opening week of the season runs from Monday 16 February to Sunday 22 February.

Week 2
The 2nd week of the season runs from Monday 23 February to Sunday 1 March.

Week 3
The 3rd week of the season runs from Monday 2 March to Sunday 8 March.

Week 4
The 4th week of the season runs from Monday 9 March to Sunday 15 March.

Week 5
The 5th week of the season runs from Monday 16 March to Sunday 22 March.

Week 6
The 6th week of the season runs from Monday 23 March to Sunday 29 March.

Week 7
The 7th week of the season runs from Monday 30 March to Sunday 5 April.

Week 8
The 8th week of the season runs from Monday 6 April to Sunday 12 April.

Week 9
The 9th week of the season runs from Monday 13 April to Sunday 19 April.

Week 10
The 10th week of the season runs from Monday 20 April to Monday 27 April. The week is one day longer than normal so as to accommodate the break for Singapore Cup 2009 between 28 April and 6 May. The league will resume on 7 May.

Week 11
The 11th week of the season runs from Thursday 7 May to Sunday 10 May, following the break for Singapore Cup 2009.

Week 12
The 12th week of the season runs from Monday 11 May to Sunday 17 May.

Week 13
The 13th week of the season runs from Monday 18 May to Sunday 24 May.

Week 14
The 14th week of the season runs from Monday 25 May to Saturday 30 May. The league will then take a break for the League Cup.

Week 15
The 15th week of the season runs from Monday 22 June to Sunday 28 June. The league resume after the break for the League Cup.

Week 16
The 16th week of the season runs from Monday 29 June to Sunday 5 July.

Week 17
The 17th week of the season runs from Monday 6 June to Sunday 12 July.

Week 18
The 18th week of the season runs from Monday 13 June to Sunday 19 July.

Week 19
The 19th week of the season runs from Monday 20 June to Friday 24 July. The week is shortened as the Singapore National Team takes on Liverpool in a friendly on Sunday 26 July.

Week 20
The 20th week of the season runs from Tuesday 28 July to Sunday 2 August. The week is shortened as the Singapore National Team takes on Liverpool in a friendly on Sunday 26 July.

Week 21
The 21st week of the season runs from Tuesday 3rd to Saturday 8 August. The week is shortened as the country celebrate its National Day on 9 August and the national team prepares for a friendly against China on 12 August. The League will resume on 14 August.

Week 22
Only one game was scheduled for week 22, the week was shortened as the national team was in action during midweek.

Week 23
The 23rd week of the season runs from Monday 17th to Sunday 23 August.

Week 24
The 24th week of the season ran from Monday 24 August to Thursday 27 August. The week was shortened to accommodate the Singapore Cup 2009 between 26 August and 4 September. The league resumed on 6 September.

Week 25
The 25th week of the season runs from Sunday 6 September to Sunday 13 September. The week is one day longer than normal so as to accommodate the break for Singapore Cup 2009 between 26 and 4 August.

Week 26
The 26th week of the season runs from Monday 14 September to Sunday 20 September.

Week 27
The 27th week of the season runs from Monday 21 September to Sunday 27 September.

Week 28
The 28th week of the season runs from Monday 28 September to Sunday 4 October.

Week 29
The 29th week of the season runs from Monday 5 October to Sunday 11 October. The week has fewer match to accommodate the Singapore Cup semi finals.

Week 30
The 30th week of the season runs from Monday 12 October to Sunday 18 October.

Week 31
The 31st week of the season ran from Tuesday 20 October to Friday 23 October. The week was shortened to accommodate the National Team participation in the Ho Chi Minh City Football Tournament. The schedule was revised after DPMM Brunei was denied to continue playing in the League by FIFA.

Week 32
The 32nd week of the season runs from Tuesday 27 October to Saturday 31 October.

Week 33
The 33rd week of the season runs from Tuesday 2 November to Friday 6 November. It was the final week of the 2009 season.

Goals

Top Scorers

Own goals

Hat-tricks

Kits and main sponsors

Stadia and attendance

Stadia

 The league plays all its Friday matches, which is televised live on MediaCorp Channel 5, at the Jalan Besar Stadium. An exception is when the AYG 2009 is in process, matches are played on the Home stadiums of the home team.

Attendance
The League will only play 193 matches after Brunei DPMM were unable to complete the season.

Managerial changes

S-League Awards Night Winners
The winners will be announced on 9 November 2009 on the 14th Great Eastern-YEO’S S.League Awards Night.

References

External links
 S.League 2009
 Brunei team to play in S-League
 S.League unveils Brunei DPMM FC as 12th team for 2009 season

Singapore Premier League seasons
1
Sing
Sing